The South Australian Railways 520 class is a class of 4-8-4 steam locomotives operated by the former South Australian Railways.

Need
During the war years in the early 1940s, the South Australian Railways (SAR) had a desperate need for additional tractive power on increasingly growing troop and supply trains and with the combined need for quick acceleration and high speed running on the flat and generally straight mainlines to the north of Adelaide to Port Pirie, as well as power "under the belt" for the long , 1-in-45 (2.2%) graded slog up the Adelaide Hills to Melbourne, a new locomotive design was required by the SAR. With this in mind, the 520 class was commissioned, combining the better features of the earlier 500 and 620 class locomotives.

Design
The class used the 4-8-4 configuration of the modified 500B class, but was also designed for work on branch lines with light  rail with a reduced tender load. The considerable weight of the locomotive was spread over eight axles, four driving and four in the leading and trailing trucks, yielding the necessary light axle loading for operation over the aforementioned territory. The 520s used this to the fullest, their normal mainline stamping grounds being on fast track express services on the Pirie line, namely the East-West Express, but also serving upon many of the Tailem Bend mixed and radiating branchline trains. The only lines that they were restricted from running on were those laid with very light  rail.

The class featured extravagant streamlining, in the style of the Pennsylvania Railroad's T1 in the United States. The original streamlining was more closely based on the T1, and class members 520-522 were fitted with such. Members 523-531 were built with a narrower front profile, attributed to by the "crown" of grill around the chimney front. The earlier streamlined model had a lower front, resulting in a squat chimney profile extended from an otherwise graceful, albeit useless, streamlined casing. During their service life, some of the class lost the cowling around their front buffer beam, a move which simplified maintenance.

The 520 class locomotives were noted for their impressive displays of power and speed. They featured specially balanced driving wheels that while only  in diameter, were designed for  operation, and were also the first locomotives in Australia to feature Timken roller bearings on all axles.

A total of 12 locomotives were built at Islington Railway Workshops between 1943 and 1947. They were progressively replaced in service from the early 1960s by diesel locomotives, and in particular the 830 class, as repairs, namely to boilers, were required. The 520s were the first class in South Australia, and possibly Australia, to facilitate the use of completely welded boiler assemblies, an idea adopted by their designer Frank Hugh Harrison after a trip to the United States of America.

The long boiler tubes of the 520 class required the blower to be on while in yards, sidings and stations, and while drifting, to prevent blowback or entry of smoke into the almost entirely closed cab. On these occasions, the locomotives emitted a quiet "whispering" sound.

Preservation
Two have been preserved:
520 at SteamRanger, was operational until 1998, when necessary repairs to the boiler, namely the removal of oil burning equipment, and a rusted tender frame, sidelined the engine.  it was being restored to operational condition.
523 at the National Railway Museum in Port Adelaide, had been used extensively as a tour engine, failing on its final farewell Australian Railway Historical Society trip at Balhannah in the late 1960s.

Class list

Fiction
In the 2016 Thomas & Friends movie The Great Race, a character named Shane was based on the SAR 520 Class. Shane returned in Series 22 where he was voiced by Shane Jacobson.

References

Further reading

External links

520
Railway locomotives introduced in 1943
Streamlined steam locomotives
4-8-4 locomotives
Broad gauge locomotives in Australia
Passenger locomotives